Rivallo IV, Prince of Brittany, Earl of Poher, (died Nov 12, 857), was a son of Saint Salomon, or Salaün, King of Brittany.

He had a son called Alan, Earl of Vannes, Prince of Brittany, who died around 907.

References

857 deaths
Earls of Poher
Princes of Brittany
9th-century Breton people